Smoot Rock is an isolated rock lying eastward of the head of Hull Glacier, about 7 nautical miles (13 km) east-southeast of Mount Steinfeld, in Marie Byrd Land. Mapped by United States Geological Survey (USGS) from surveys and U.S. Navy air photos, 1959–69. Named by Advisory Committee on Antarctic Names (US-ACAN) for Henry T. Smoot, meteorologist at Byrd Station, 1969–70.

Rock formations of Marie Byrd Land